Diana Lewis Burgin is an author, and Professor of Russian at the University of Massachusetts Boston; she received her B.A. in Russian from Swarthmore College, her M.A. & Ph.D. from Harvard University's Slavic Languages and Literatures Department. She has been teaching Russian at University of Massachusetts, Boston since 1975.

She is the daughter of Richard Burgin and Ruth Posselt, who married on July 3, 1940.  She has published a narrative poem "Richard Burgin: A Life in Verse"  (Slavica Pub, 1989) describing her father's biography.

Works
 
 "After the Ball is Over: Sofia Parnok Creative Relationship with Marina Tsvetaeva", Russia Review, Vol. 4, 1988
 "Sofia Parnok and the Writing of a Lesbian Poets Life", Slavic Review, 51/2, 1992, pp. 214–231

Poetry

Books
 Richard Burgin: A Life in Verse, 1989, Slavica Pub,

Translations

Citations
 The Twentieth-century Russian Novel, David C. Gillespie, page 148
 A plot of her own, Sona Stephan Hoisington, page 144
 Pushkin and the genres of madness, Gary Rosenshield, page 209

References

External links
 Diana Burgin website
 Reference guide to Russian literature By Neil Cornwell, Nicole Christian, page 614

Harvard University alumni
Swarthmore College alumni
Living people
University of Massachusetts Boston faculty
American women poets
Year of birth missing (living people)
American women academics
21st-century American women